Florida's state forests are state forests overseen by the Florida Forest Service. There are 35 state forests in Florida covering more than 1,058,000 acres. The first state forest in Florida was Pine Log State Forest, established on 6,960 acres in 1936. Cary State Forest was established in 1937. Blackwater River State Forest and Withlacoochee State Forest were added in the late 1950s and early 1960s.

Florida began large land purchase and preservation efforts in the late 1970s and management focus shifted from timber and wildlife focuses to a "multiple land use management ethic"  including "conservation of natural and cultural resources, wildlife management, protection of water resources, and outdoor recreation."

Florida state forests

References

Florida Forest Service website
 Florida Forest Service

See also
 List of U.S. National Forests

 
Florida
State forests